Statistics of Emperor's Cup in the 1937 season.

Overview
It was contested by 4 teams, and Keio University won the championship. Kumamoto Club withdrew before the start of the tournament.

Results

Semifinals
Kobe University of Commerce 2–1 Poseung College
Keio University 6–1 Osaka Club

Final
 
Kobe University of Commerce 0–3 Keio University
Keio University won the championship.

References

 NHK

Emperor's Cup
1937 in Japanese football